Raadi may refer to:
 Raadi, Tartu County, borough in Estonia
 Raadi or Raadi-Kruusamäe, neighbourhood of Tartu
 Raadi Lake, lake in Tartu County, Estonia